Etaxalus iliacus is a species of beetle in the family Cerambycidae. It was described by Francis Polkinghorne Pascoe in 1865. It is known from Java, Malaysia and Borneo.

References

Pteropliini
Beetles described in 1865